The 2007 National Football League Draft was the 72nd annual meeting of National Football League (NFL) franchises to select newly eligible American football players. It took place at Radio City Music Hall in New York City, New York, on April 28 and April 29, 2007. The draft was televised for the 28th consecutive year on ESPN and ESPN2. The NFL Network also broadcast coverage of the event, its second year doing so. There were 255 draft selections: 223 regular selections (instead of the typical 224) and 32 compensatory selections. A supplemental draft was also held after the regular draft and before the regular season. This was the first draft presided over by new NFL Commissioner Roger Goodell.

The first round was the longest in the history of the NFL draft, lasting six hours, eight minutes. One of the big stories of the draft was the fall of Notre Dame quarterback Brady Quinn. Quinn had been projected as a potential first overall pick in early mock drafts and had been invited to attend the draft in person, but he wasn't selected until the 22nd pick in the first round by the Cleveland Browns, who acquired the pick in a trade with the Dallas Cowboys. LSU quarterback JaMarcus Russell was selected first overall by the Oakland Raiders after he had replaced Quinn as the projected first selection among most analysts following his performance in the 2007 Sugar Bowl against Quinn and Notre Dame. Russell is considered by many as one of the biggest draft busts in NFL history, and was out of the NFL after only three seasons. Quinn also had a largely unsuccessful pro career.

Those selections notwithstanding, Bleacher Report named the 2007 draft class the "greatest draft class in the last 25 years" in 2012 due to the heavy volume of reliable starters, as well as players selected that are now widely regarded as future Hall of Famers, such as Patrick Willis, Darrelle Revis, Marshawn Lynch, and Marshal Yanda; first round selections Calvin Johnson, Joe Thomas, and Adrian Peterson are widely regarded as being among the greatest to ever play at their respective positions.

Player breakdown
The following is the breakdown of the 255 players by position:

 Nine Florida Gators were drafted, more than any other university. Ohio State was second with eight players selected. However, only one of the 17 players drafted from the two universities has made it to a Pro Bowl, Reggie Nelson.
 Of the 40 underclassmen who entered the draft, 29 were selected.

 Louisiana State University set a school record with four players drafted in the first round.

Player selections

Supplemental draft selections
For each player selected in the supplemental draft, the selecting team forfeits its pick in that round in the draft of the following season.

Notable undrafted players

Hall of Famers

 Calvin Johnson, wide receiver from Georgia Tech, taken 1st round 2nd overall by the Detroit Lions.
Inducted: Professional Football Hall of Fame Class of 2021.

 Joe Thomas, offensive tackle from Wisconsin, taken 1st round 3rd overall by the Cleveland Browns.
Inducted: Professional Football Hall of Fame Class of 2023.

 Darrelle Revis, cornerback from Pittsburgh, taken 1st round 14th overall by the New York Jets.
Inducted: Professional Football Hall of Fame Class of 2023.

References/Notes
General references
 ESPN website – NFL 2007 Draft 
 SI website – NFL 2007 Draft
 NFL website – 2007 Draft
 

Specific references

National Football League Draft
Draft
2007 in sports in New York City
Radio City Music Hall
NFL Draft
American football in New York City
2000s in Manhattan
Sporting events in New York City
Sports in Manhattan